Air Dream was a short-lived charter airline based in Cambodia. During 2007, it operated flights between Siem Reap, Cambodia, and Hanoi, Vietnam. Its single aircraft, chartered from financially troubled Royal Khmer Airlines, was flown to Noi Bai International Airport, Hanoi, in late 2007 for maintenance reasons and abandoned there subsequently, as the airline was shut down.

Fleet 
Air Dream operated one ageing Boeing 727-200 jet airliner, which was originally delivered to American Airlines in 1988.

References

External links
Air Dream Fleet

Defunct airlines of Cambodia
Airlines established in 2007
Airlines disestablished in 2007
Cambodian companies established in 2007
2007 disestablishments in Cambodia